Margaret of Burgundy (1250 – 4 September 1308) was Queen of Sicily and Naples by marriage to Charles I of Sicily.  She was also a ruling Countess of Tonnerre from 1262 until 1308.

Life
The second daughter of Odo, Count of Nevers, and Maud of Dampierre, Margaret was Countess of Tonnerre by inheritance from 1262 until her death.

Queen
She became Queen consort of Sicily by her marriage to Charles of Anjou, King of Sicily and Count of Anjou and Provence, on 18 November 1268. Their only daughter, Margaret, died in infancy. She also became titular Queen consort of Jerusalem, after Charles bought the title from Mary of Antioch in 1277. She and her husband lost the title of King and Queen of Sicily in 1283, becoming King and Queen of Naples only.

Later life
After Charles died in 1285, Margaret retired to her lands in Tonnerre, residing in the castle there with Margaret of Brienne (widow of Bohemund VII of Tripoli) and Catherine I of Courtenay, titular Empress of Constantinople (a granddaughter of Charles of Anjou by his first wife). There at Tonnerre, the three women lived lives of charity and prayer; Margaret founded there l’Hospice des Fontenilles, and provided adequate funds for its maintenance.

She died in 1308 without children; she left her possessions to her great-nephew, John II of Châlon-Auxerre. She was buried in the l'Hospice.

References
 Previté-Orton, L'Italia nella seconda metà del XIII secolo, in «Storia del mondo medievale», vol. V, 1980, pp. 198–244.

1250 births
1308 deaths
Royal consorts of Naples
Royal consorts of Sicily
Albanian royal consorts
Countesses of Anjou
Countesses of Maine
Princesses of Achaea
House of Burgundy
13th-century Italian women
Princesses of Taranto
Charles I of Anjou
13th-century women rulers
14th-century women rulers
13th-century Sicilian people